Keehner Park is a public park located in West Chester, Ohio. The park is locally renown as a location for various community events, such as free concerts and outdoor performances. The park offers playgrounds, picnic shelters, athletic and sport areas including baseball diamonds, soccer fields, and tennis courts, walking and mountain biking trails, and additional utilities such as restrooms and public waste disposal dumpsters.

History

Voter approval to use funding from the Ohio Department of Natural Resources resulted in the creation of Keehner park in 1976. The park is named after a local farming family that existed in the early days of West Chester.  Keehner Park is the current home of a reconstructed 1833 log cabin, relocated to the park from Preble County in 1990.

Park Events

Keehner Park frequently serves as host to a variety of community events.  One of the more well known events is the West Chester Concert Series. Sponsored by Fifth Third, the event occurs each Saturday in the park's amphitheater, featuring performances by a variety of local music groups. Historically the park has hosted nature education programs; stargazing; Easter egg hunts; Halloween events with wagon rides, petting zoos, haunted trails, costume contests, and other autumn themed attractions; seasonal decorations of the log cabin; and other annual events.

The park frequently hosts sporting events and provides access to baseball diamonds, soccer fields, basketball courts, and tennis courts.

Gallery

References

Parks in Ohio
1976 establishments in Ohio
Tourist attractions in Ohio